Bolto may refer to:
Bolto, South Australia, a locality on the left bank of the Murray River near Mannum
Laevar Bolto, character in DC Comics
Paisa Bolto Aahe, a 1943 film directed by Vishram Bedekar